Steve is a syndicated talk show that was hosted by entertainer Steve Harvey. It premiered on September 5, 2017, as a successor to Harvey's Chicago-based Steve Harvey talk show produced by Endemol. The series was produced from Universal Studios in California in partnership with Endeavor Content and NBCUniversal Television Distribution, and was described as having a larger focus on celebrity guests and Harvey's comedy (as opposed to the previous series, which focused more on human interest topics).

In 2018, the show was dropped by NBCUniversal and its stations for the 2019–2020 television season, in favor of The Kelly Clarkson Show. As a result, Steve was cancelled, and aired its final episode on June 26, 2019. In December 2019, Endeavor Content reached an agreement with Facebook Watch to revive Steve as an original series on the platform. Steve on Watch premiered on January 6, 2020.

History 
Harvey's previous talk show, Steve Harvey, was produced by Endemol Shine North America in Chicago, and ran for five seasons. In November 2016, it was announced that the program would be cancelled after the 2016–17 season. Concurrently, it was announced that Harvey had entered into a partnership with IMG and his previous distributor, NBCUniversal Television Distribution, to produce a new talk show in Los Angeles with an ownership stake, more creative control, and a celebrity-oriented format. The new series, Steve, originated from a new set at Stage 1 at Universal Studios in Universal City, California.

Production
Steve tapped Shane Farley as the executive producer, alongside Gerald Washington, Mark Shapiro, and Mike Antinoro. To accommodate Harvey, production of his radio show The Steve Harvey Morning Show, and the game show  Family Feud were re-located from Atlanta to Los Angeles (the primetime Celebrity Family Feud had already been filmed in Los Angeles ahead of the move of the main, syndicated series). The show premiered on September 5, 2017, with guests Chelsea Handler, Marlon Wayans, and James Arthur.

Steve was picked up in 90% of the U.S., including most of the NBC Owned Television Stations group (where it inherited the previous program's timeslots as a lead-in to The Ellen DeGeneres Show). In January 2018, the show was renewed for a second and final season that premiered on September 4.

Cancellation 
On September 19, 2018, it was announced that NBC Owned Television Stations had picked up The Kelly Clarkson Show—which is produced and distributed by NBCUniversal, to replace Steve on its stations for the 2019–20 television season. Insiders reported that IMG had been shopping the series to a new distributor or outlet.

In January 2019, Harvey stated that he was caught off-guard by the news, arguing that he "thought it would have been nice of [NBC]" to inform that he was being replaced by Kelly Clarkson. Harvey noted that, across both shows, he had hosted daytime talk shows for seven consecutive seasons, despite volatility in daytime television due to other options such as streaming. In May 2019, Steve was officially cancelled, and its final episode aired on June 26.

Format
Harvey described the new show's format as being more akin to a late-night talk show and one of his competitors, The Ellen DeGeneres Show, with a monologue, audience games, and celebrity guests. Harvey lamented that it was harder to secure celebrity guests for his previous show in Chicago, explaining that "I designed that show around a great city and those great people. We flew people in, but we didn't have to. In five years, I never had a regular person cancel. I don't expect that to be the case out here. Famous people cancel." Harvey stated that the new show would still feature human interest segments, but that he would be able to "interject a little bit more of my personality in terms of humor in a lot more areas".

Steve on Watch
It was later announced in December 2019 that Harvey and Endeavor Content had signed a deal with Facebook Watch to produce a continuation of the show as a web series, Steve on Watch, with an initial 10-week run beginning January 6, 2020. Early episodes of the series were filmed at the Tyler Perry Studios in Atlanta. The show was later shot at Trilith Studios in Fayetteville, Georgia.

References

External links
 
 

2010s American television talk shows
2020s American television talk shows
2017 American television series debuts
2019 American television series endings
2020 American television series debuts
First-run syndicated television programs in the United States
Television series by Universal Television
English-language television shows
Facebook Watch original programming
American television series revived after cancellation